Virgin Fibra S.r.l. is an Italian telecommunications company owned by Virgin Group Ltd., which offers fiber optic telephony services in FTTH technology.

History and operations
Founded in August 2020 in Milan, Virgin Fibra is headed by a group of Italian and foreign entrepreneurs.

Virgin Fibra is partly owned by Richard Branson's Virgin Group, and is the third company in Italy after Virgin Active and Virgin Radio to carry the brand. The commercial launch took place in August 2022, two years after its foundation.

Virgin Fibra operates in the sector of broadband fixed Internet connections, offering subscriptions to its customers who sign contracts for the supply of optical fiber Internet connections, exclusively with FTTH.

The company is led by founder and CEO, Tom Mockridge, who also serves as chairman of the board of directors.

Virgin Fibra's services are available to private customers, VAT holders and small and medium-sized enterprises in Italy. Virgin Fibra distributes its services exclusively online on its Website and operates in full integration with Open Fiber, owner of the largest Italian fiber-optic network FTTH.

See also
 Tom Mockridge
 Virgin Group

References

External links 
 

Virgin Group
Italian companies established in 2020
Telecommunications companies established in 2020
Companies based in Milan
Telecommunications companies of Italy
Italian brands